Idaea orilochia is a moth in the family Geometridae first described by Herbert Druce in 1893. It is found in Panama and Costa Rica.

The forewings and hindwings are very pale fawn colour, slightly irrorated (sprinkled) with fine reddish-brown scales. The forewings have two dark brown spots on the costal margin and a small spot at the end of the cell. The hindwings are crossed by a rather wide reddish-brown band and with a reddish-brown streak at the anal angle.

References

Moths described in 1893
Sterrhini
Moths of Central America